Hoodman Blind is a melodrama of 1885, by Wilson Barrett and Henry Arthur Jones.

Plot
A confused man blames some misdeeds on his wife.  Actually they were committed by her lookalike sister.

References

1885 plays
British plays
Melodramas